Lambertus Hendrik Frederik Gunther (10 December 1899 – 14 October 1968) was a Dutch rower. He competed at the 1928 Summer Olympics in Amsterdam with the men's single sculls where he came fourth.

References

1899 births
1968 deaths
Dutch male rowers
Olympic rowers of the Netherlands
Rowers at the 1928 Summer Olympics
Rowers from Amsterdam
European Rowing Championships medalists
20th-century Dutch people